Dendrocnide cordifolia, commonly known as the stinging tree, is a plant in the nettle family Urticaceae endemic to the Atherton Tablelands, south west of Cairns, Queensland. Contact with the plant (like many others in the family) results in a painful sting, however the intensity and duration of the pain from this plant is extreme.

Description

They are partly surrounded by a white, globular, fleshy body derived from the swollen pedicel and is somewhat similar in appearance a small white raspberry.

Taxonomy
This species was first described as Laportea cordifolia in 1959 by the Australian botanist Lindsay Stuart Smith  and was published in the journal Proceedings of the Royal Society of Queensland His description was based on a specimen he collected in 1957 near Atherton, Queensland. In 1969 the Singaporean botanist Wee-Lek Chew, in his paper titled Laportia and Allied Genera, merged L. cordifolia with Dendrocnide cordata and for almost 30 years that remained the status quo. However, in 1997, the Australian  botanists Betsy Jackes and Marina Hurley showed that there were errors in Chew's work, and published a paper in Austrobaileya which reinstated L. cordifolia as a distinct species, but under the new combination that remains today, i.e. Dendrocnide cordifolia.

Etymology
The genus name Dendrocnide is derived from the Ancient Greek words déndron, meaning "tree", and knídē, meaning "stinging needle". The species epithet cordifolia is a Latin word derived from cor (heart) and folium (leaf), which is a reference to the heart-shaped leaves of this species.

Distribution and habitat
It grows as an understory plant in disturbed areas of rainforest, such as treefalls, creek margins, roadsides, and man-made clearings.

Conservation
This species is listed by the Queensland Department of Environment and Science as least concern. , it has not been assessed by the IUCN.

Toxicity
D. cordifolia produces intense pain when a person comes into contact with any part of the plant, very similar to  the more well-known and closely-related D. moriodes. A detailed discussion of the toxicity of both of these plants can be found in the D. moroides article.

References

External links
 
 
 View a map of recorded sightings of Dendrocnide cordifolia at the Australasian Virtual Herbarium
 See images of Dendrocnide cordifolia on Flickriver

cordifolia
Endemic flora of Queensland
Taxa named by Lindsay Stuart Smith
Taxa named by Betsy Rivers Jackes
Taxa described in 1997